The 2019 Mikhail Voronin Cup took place on November 29–30 in Penza, Russia.

Medal winners

Senior

Junior

References

Voronin Cup
2019 in gymnastics
2019 in Russian sport
Sport in Penza
December 2019 sports events in Russia